Girivalam  is a 2005 Indian Tamil-language romantic thriller film directed by Shivraj. The film stars Shaam, Richard and Roshini. it is a remake of 2002 Hindi film Humraaz.

Plot 

Arjun heads a dance troupe and Priya, one of the dancers in the troupe is in love with him. Their aim is to be the permanent fixture at the hotel of Giriprasad, a millionaire. They lose the competition but still see their dream realised when the lead dancer in the winning troupe dies in an accident. Soon, Giriprasad falls for Priya and his sincerity makes her reciprocate his feelings. It turns out that Arjun was trying to get Priya to marry Giriprasad to get the latter's money.

However, later, Swetha, another dancer from Arjun's troupe, learns of Arjun's actions. She blackmails Karan to give her money or else she will tell Giriprasad and the police about the death of the lead dancer from the winning troupe. It is revealed that Arjun actually killed the lead dancer of the winning troupe on purpose; the winning troupe lead dancer's death was not an accident. Arjun meets Swetha at the designated place to hand her the money but he instead kills her. While Arjun is not around, just before dying, Swetha calls Giriprasad to reveal the truth. However, Giriprasad is not in his office, so the call ends up in the voice mailbox instead.

Affected by the problem of selecting a nice husband over a personal career, Priya is walking home and suddenly meets with an accident. However, she later wakes up from her coma after having a nightmare. She also learns that Giriprasad is fasting for two days. Priya tells Arjun that she will not divorce Giriprasad. Arjun is very upset and decides to get revenge on Priya and Giriprasad. In order to save his life, Priya gives her jewelry to Arjun. Arjun calls Giriprasad privately from a public phone and lies to him that Priya loves Arjun and she is giving away the money that she stole from Giriprasad to Arjun. Giriprasad follows Priya and finds out that indeed Priya is meeting Arjun and giving her jewelry to Arjun. Giriprasad is puzzled. Later, he also finds out about Swetha's recording in his office.

Giriprasad blackmails Arjun by making him listen to the tape to kill Priya. Giriprasad explains all the points of the plan all the way up to the plan and tells Arjun that he will call on the landline and Arjun will attack Priya when she picks up the phone. Giriprasad tells Arjun that the phone should not be disconnected when she picks up the phone because he wants to hear Priya scream when she is about to die. Meanwhile, Priya is not aware of the plan and she wants to confess everything to Giriprasad in an audio recording and she also wants to replace the tape with the music cassette in Giriprasad's car. In the recordings, she says that if Giriprasad has forgiven her, he should give her a call or she will leave him forever.

Giriprasad is unaware of the tape because he is in the middle of a meeting with an employee that day. Arjun enters the house as told and is expecting the call. At the same time, Priya is also waiting for a call from Giriprasad, assuming he is going to forgive her. Giriprasad calls the landline as planned and Priya answers the phone. Arjun attacks her at the same time and makes sure Giriprasad hears her screaming. Giriprasad later gets in the car and listens to the tape in horror. He rushes to Priya's house to save her, however, he sees the police and an ambulance waiting at the house when he arrives at the house.

It is revealed that Priya was saved and Arjun was the one who saved her. Meanwhile, the person who actually attacked Priya is a small thief, who is dead. Arjun then tells Giriprasad that there is nothing he can prove, by using Swetha's cassette. He blackmails Giriprasad by telling him he recorded the meeting with him about the murder and gives Giriprasad three options for his life: Giriprasad should either divorce Priya, go to jail, or commit suicide. The following day, Giriprasad meets Arjun at a decided spot and says he is ready to go to jail, but only after Arjun is killed. Both men break out in a fight Arjun is about to kill Giriprasad when the former is confronted by Priya. Arjun tells Priya about Giriprasad's plan to kill her, but she says that she is aware of it. Arjun shoots Priya and Giriprasad runs to kill Arjun. Giriprasad beats up Arjun terribly and Arjun is about to kill Giriprasad when Priya (who was actually still alive) shoots Arjun multiple times with Arjun's gun and Arjun slowly dies. In the end, Giriprasad and Priya reunite together.

Cast

Production 
The film is directed by Shivraj, who previously helmed Adi Thadi (2004) and is the second venture of Varity Frames after Kadhal Kirukkan (2003). It is a remake of the Hindi film Humraaz (2002). After the failure of Kadhal Virus (2002), Richard accepted this film after his brother-in-law Ajith Kumar okayed the script. Shaam played a negative role in the film while Richard plays the rich husband. Newcomer Tanu Roy plays Richard's wife. The film was being shot during August 2004, and the film was almost done shooting during September 2004.

Soundtrack 
The music was by Deva, while the lyrics were composed by Piraisoodan, Snehan and Pa. Vijay. The song "Nee Yaaro Nee Yaaro" is a remake of the song "Bardaasht Nahin Kar Sakta" from the original Hindi film Humraaz and it is also the only song from the original Hindi version.

Release 
The film released alongside the low budget films Gurudeva and Thaka Thimi Tha and did not fare well at the box office. One critic stated that "The movie gets too convoluted for its own good towards the end".

References

External links 

2000s Tamil-language films
2005 films
Films scored by Deva (composer)
Tamil remakes of Hindi films